Katiyar is originally a Brij language word known as Katyar but later in kannauji dialect it convert into katiyar. It is derived from the word "Katar" meaning sword. Notable people with the surname include:

Sarvagya Singh Katiyar former Vice Chancellor of CSJM University Kanpur
Vinay Katiyar, founder of Bajrang Dal

References

Indian surnames